Fena may refer to:

 FENA, the Federal News Agency of the Federation of Bosnia and Herzegovina
 Fractional sodium excretion (FENa), a medical parameter representing the fraction of sodium in urine relative to the fraction of sodium in circulation
 Fena Lake, the largest lake on the island of Guam
 Jack Fena (1923-2010), American politician and judge
 Lori Fena (born 1961), American internet activist, entrepreneur, and author
 Fena: Pirate Princess, a TV series